Sweet Phoebe is an Australian play script by Michael Gow. The 1994 world premiere production starring Cate Blanchett was by Sydney Theatre Company under the artistic direction of Wayne Harrison. Other notable performances of the play include a 1995 stage production at the Croydon Warehouse also starring Cate Blanchett in her first stage performance in London.

Plot
When pet dog Phoebe goes missing, the impact on her minders is devastating. As Helen and Frazer desperately search the city streets, they encounter the unexpected, and are irrevocably changed.

Reception
Critical reception for the script has been mixed to positive, with the Dallas Morning News panning it as "lifeless".

Awards
 1995 NSW Premier's Literary Award - Play Award

References

1994 plays
Plays by Michael Gow